Lamprosphaerus is a genus of leaf beetles in the subfamily Eumolpinae. They are found in Central America and South America.

Species

 Lamprosphaerus abdominalis Baly, 1859
 Lamprosphaerus aerosus Weise, 1921
 Lamprosphaerus alternatus (Baly, 1878)
 Lamprosphaerus brevicornis (Jacoby, 1890)
 Lamprosphaerus buckleyi (Jacoby, 1881)
 Lamprosphaerus chapuisi (Jacoby, 1890)
 Lamprosphaerus coccinellinus Bechyné, 1950
 Lamprosphaerus constitutus (Bechyné, 1950)
 Lamprosphaerus dives (Lefèvre, 1877)
 Lamprosphaerus elephas (Baly, 1878)
 Lamprosphaerus femininus Bechyné, 1950
 Lamprosphaerus femoratus (Baly, 1878)
 Lamprosphaerus fulvipes (Jacoby, 1881)
 Lamprosphaerus fulvitarsis (Jacoby, 1890)
 Lamprosphaerus gigas (Jacoby, 1897)
 Lamprosphaerus gloriosus (Lefèvre, 1876)
 Lamprosphaerus granarius (Erichson, 1847)
 Lamprosphaerus hirticollis (Baly, 1878)
 Lamprosphaerus ingenuus (Baly, 1878)
 Lamprosphaerus jacobyi Bechyné, 1953
 Lamprosphaerus maximus (Lefèvre, 1875)
 Lamprosphaerus mexicanus (Jacoby, 1890)
 Lamprosphaerus nitidicollis (Baly, 1878)
 Lamprosphaerus opacicollis (Lefèvre, 1875)
 Lamprosphaerus oribocanus Bechyné & Bechyné, 1961
 Lamprosphaerus plagioderoides Bechyné, 1955
 Lamprosphaerus regina Bechyné, 1950
 Lamprosphaerus rufipes (Chapuis, 1874)
 Lamprosphaerus rufiventris (Erichson, 1847)
 Lamprosphaerus similis Bechyné, 1950
 Lamprosphaerus sumptuosus (Baly, 1865)
 Lamprosphaerus virens Bechyné, 1950

References

Eumolpinae
Chrysomelidae genera
Beetles of Central America
Beetles of South America
Taxa named by Joseph Sugar Baly